Angela Smith may refer to:

People
Angela Smith (squash player) (born 1953), English professional player and coach
Angela Smith, Baroness Smith of Basildon (born 1959), English peer; MP from 1997 to 2010
Angela Smith (athlete) (born 1960), English long-distance runner; married name Angela Tooby
Angela Smith (South Yorkshire politician) (born 1961), English MP from 2010 to 2019

Fictional characters
Angela Smith, Mona's rival on the 1999 Canadian children's animated TV series Mona the Vampire

See also
Angie Smit (born 1991), New Zealand middle-distance runner; married name Angie Petty